Francis Draper Lewis was a Pennsylvania lawyer who co-founded the law firm Morgan Lewis at Philadelphia in 1873 with Charles Eldridge Morgan, Jr.

Early life and marriage
Born in Boston on August 29, 1849, his parents were Ann Homer (née Kidder) Lewis and Joseph W. Lewis, Lewis Brothers & Company dry-goods wholesale merchant.

On April 28, 1887, he married Mary Humphreys Chandler, daughter of Charles Wesley Chandler (1833 - 1882) and Julia Adelaide Peabody.

Education and career
Lewis graduated from Amherst College in 1869, then from Harvard Law School in 1871. He was admitted to the Pennsylvania Bar in 1872 and began his practice in the offices of John Christian Bullitt.

On March 10, 1873, Lewis and Charles Eldridge Morgan, Jr. co-founded law firm Morgan Lewis, which became Morgan, Lewis & Bockius in 1883.

Notes

References

External links
Lewisiana or The Lewis letter — "A Monthly Inter-Family Paper,"  Elliot, Conn., USA, 1887.
 

1849 births
1930 deaths
Lawyers from Philadelphia
Amherst College alumni
Harvard Law School alumni